is a natural history museum in the city of Odawara in Kanagawa Prefecture, Japan. The museum has an extensive geology section, and focuses on the flora and fauna of Kanagawa prefecture.

The museum is open from 9:00 to 4:30, and closed on Mondays and the second Tuesdays of the month (except national holidays, when they close the day after), and during the New Year's period.

References

External links
 English

Prefectural museums
Museums in Kanagawa Prefecture
Buildings and structures in Odawara
Natural history museums in Japan
Geology museums in Japan
Museums established in 1995
1995 establishments in Japan